Tad S. Murty (or Murthy) is an Indian-Canadian oceanographer and expert on tsunamis.  He is the former president of the Tsunami Society. He is an adjunct professor in the departments of Civil Engineering and Earth Sciences at the University of Ottawa. Murty has a PhD degree in oceanography and meteorology from the University of Chicago.
He is co-editor of the journal Natural Hazards with Tom Beer of CSIRO and Vladimir Schenk of the Czech Republic.

Climate change
He has taken part in a review of the 2007 Intergovernmental Panel on Climate Change.

Murty characterizes himself as a global warming skeptic. In an August 17, 2006 interview, he stated that "I started  with a firm belief about global warming, until I started working on it myself...I switched to the other side in the early 1990s when Fisheries and Oceans Canada asked me to prepare a position paper and I started to look into the problem seriously.".  Murty has also stated that global warming is "the biggest scientific hoax being perpetrated on humanity. There is no global warming due to human anthropogenic activities."  Murty was among the sixty scientists from climate research and related disciplines who authored a 2006 open letter to Canadian Prime Minister Stephen Harper criticizing the Kyoto Protocol and the scientific basis of anthropogenic global warming.

References

External links
 Indo-Canada Award

Canadian oceanographers
Indian oceanographers
Indian emigrants to Canada
University of Chicago alumni
Living people
Academic staff of the University of Ottawa
1938 births
20th-century Indian earth scientists